Smolenskaya Square is a square in the center of Moscow. The Garden Ring crosses the square. Arbat street runs towards it and ends near the Foreign Ministry skyscraper, the main building of the Ministry of Foreign Affairs of Russia. The latter faces Smolenskaya square.

The name is sometimes used as a metonym for the Russian Ministry of Foreign Affairs and the Russian foreign policy in general.

Squares in Moscow
Arbat District